Courage is a 1939 Soviet adventure film directed by Mikhail Kalatozov.

Plot 
The film tells about the pilot of the civil air fleet Aleksey Tomilin, who suddenly decides from now on to avoid extreme situations and fly only in a straight line, but everything changes drastically when a saboteur sits next to him.

Starring 
 Oleg Zhakov as Aleksey Tomilin - pilot
 Dmitry Dudnikov as Mustafa Khadzhi - japanese army spy
 Konstantin Sorokin as Vlasov - pilot
 Aleksey Bondi as Squadron leader
 Aleksandr Benyaminov as Yusuf - barman
 Fyodor Fedorovsky as Captain Bystrov
 Pyotr Nikashin as Kostya Kuzmin - flight engineer
 Zula Nakhashkiyev as Dugar
 Tamara Nagayeva as Faizi - pilot
 Nikolai Urvantsev as Dispatcher (uncredited)

References

External links 

1939 films
1930s Russian-language films
Soviet adventure films
Soviet black-and-white films
1939 adventure films